Russel Simmons is an American businessman. He co-founded Yelp, Inc. with Jeremy Stoppelman and served as CTO from July 2004 until he left in June 2010. Prior to co-founding Yelp, Simmons was a co-founder of PayPal, where he was a Lead Software Architect, and has been described as a member of the "PayPal Mafia." In 2014 he founded Learnirvana.

Simmons graduated from University of Illinois at Urbana–Champaign in 1998 with a Bachelor of Science in Computer Science.

References 

PayPal people
American company founders
Living people
Year of birth missing (living people)
Place of birth missing (living people)
Grainger College of Engineering alumni
Chief technology officers